Utak is a traditional Filipino ethnic Moro weapon in the Sulu Archipelago. It is a sword with a wide tip designed for cutting forward and is a one-handed weapon meant for chopping. The sword is about 24 to 28 inches in length with a hooked grip to prevent slipping when wet.

References

Filipino swords